Reshma Pasupuleti (born 23 July 1983) is an Indian actress who primarily appears in Tamil language films and TV series. She started her career as an anchor and news reporter for a Telugu TV channel. She began her TV career in Tamil through Vamsam. In 2016, She acted in Vishnu Vishal's Velainu Vandhutta Vellaikaaran in a supporting role.

Early life
Reshma Pasupuleti was born into a Telugu-speaking family to Prasad Pasupuleti, a Telugu film producer. Pasupuleti pursued her education abroad, first in Arkansas, and then completed her engineering degree in the computer science department from the Texas A&M University. She joined Amitysoft Software Institution for a course on software testing and later also briefly worked as an air hostess with Delta Airlines.

Career
Pasupuleti began working as a news anchor English news for TV5. She was then cast on the Tamil series Vamsam.

Pasupuleti appeared in Masala Padam (2015), playing the heroine. She subsequently appeared in several more films, notably playing a news reader in Ko 2 (2016) and a comedy role in Velainu Vandhutta Vellaikaaran (2016) alongside Soori. She then appeared in Girls (2016), a Tamil and Malayalam bilingual, about illicit relationships. In 2019, Pasupuleti appeared on the reality television show, Bigg Boss Tamil 3.

Filmography

All films are in Tamil, unless otherwise noted.

Television

Serials

Shows

Web series

References

External links 

Living people
Actresses in Tamil cinema
Actresses in Malayalam cinema
21st-century Indian actresses
Actresses in Tamil television
Bigg Boss (Tamil TV series) contestants
Texas A&M University alumni
Actresses in Telugu cinema
1983 births